Surrender is an album by English soprano Sarah Brightman featuring songs composed by Andrew Lloyd Webber. The album’s booklet also includes Lloyd Webber's commentary for each song.

Track listing

Charts

References

1995 soundtrack albums
Theatre soundtracks
Sarah Brightman albums
Collaborative albums
Albums produced by Andrew Lloyd Webber
Albums produced by Nigel Wright